Sithara (born 30 June 1973) is an Indian actress known for her works predominantly in Malayalam, Tamil, Telugu, and Kannada films. She made her Tamil debut in 1989 with K. Balachander's Pudhu Pudhu Arthangal. She is best known for her performances in super-hit films such as Padayappa, Halunda Tavaru, Pudhu Vasantham. She is also known for her works in Television.

In a film career spanning thirty seven years, she has starred in over hundred films in a variety of roles. Her recent Telugu hits include Srimanthudu, Shankaraabharanm, and Bhale Bhale Magadivoy. 

Sithara made a Tamil cinema comeback with Nagesh Thiraiyarangam directed by Guinness record holder Isaq.

Early life
Sithara was born as the eldest among three children to Parameshwaran Nair and Valsala Nair in Kilimanoor. Her father Parameshwaran Nair was an engineer at Electricity board and her mother was also an officer at Electricity board. She has two younger brothers, Pratheesh and Abhilash. She Studied in Lourdes Mount School, Vattappara. She was studying for pre university degree at Sree Sankara Vidyapeetom College, Kilimanoor, when she acted in her debut movie Kaveri (1986).

Selected filmography

Tamil films

Kannada films

Telugu films

Malayalam films

TV serials

Personal life 
Sithara never married, a decision she took early in her life after her father's death.

References

External links
 

Indian film actresses
Actresses in Malayalam cinema
Actresses in Kannada cinema
Actresses in Telugu cinema
Actresses in Tamil cinema
Malayali people
Living people
Actresses from Kerala
People from Thiruvananthapuram district
20th-century Indian actresses
21st-century Indian actresses
1973 births
Actresses in Malayalam television
Actresses in Tamil television
Actresses in Telugu television